Anthony Jerome "Spud" Webb (born July 13, 1963) is an American former professional basketball player. He is currently the president of basketball operations for the Texas Legends, the NBA G League team for the Dallas Mavericks in Frisco, Texas.

Early years 
Webb was born into poverty in Dallas, Texas. He was raised in a small two-bedroom home and saw basketball as an inspiration. Webb was not tall, but he used his quickness and jumping ability to outplay bigger kids. Starting in the seventh grade, Webb was told that he was too short to play basketball. He got a chance to play on his junior high team only after two players did not complete physical exam requirements in time for the first game. Webb scored 22 points in his first game. At Wilmer-Hutchins High School, he played on the junior varsity team and made a large impact; when he made the varsity team, he averaged 26 points per game as a senior.

College career

Midland College 
Despite his impressive high school record, Webb attracted little interest from colleges. He was recruited by North Texas Basketball Coach Bill Blakeley (who would later become his agent throughout his NBA career) but received his first opportunity to play on a college basketball team at Midland College (in Midland, Texas), where he led the Chaparrals to the junior college national title in 1982. In the championship game, Midland defeated top-ranked and previously unbeaten Miami-Dade North of Florida, 93-88, in double overtime. Webb led all scorers in with 36 points, shooting 10-15 from the floor and 16-18 from the line. His performance at the tournament earned Webb a write-up in Sports Illustrated and national attention. In 1983, he was named an NJCAA All-American by the National Junior College Athletic Association.

North Carolina State University 
Webb was planning to transfer to North Texas to play for Bill Blakeley but Blakeley was fired in May 1983 and Spud prepared to go work with his dad at Webb’s Soul Mart near Fair Park in Dallas. Coach Blakeley reached out to his friend, Tom Abatemarco, an assistant coach at North Carolina State University, and took him to watch Spud play in a summer league game at MLK Recreation Center. Abatemarco was impressed and arranged for Webb to meet head coach Jim Valvano, who offered Webb a scholarship. He played for NC State in the 1983–84 and 1984-85 seasons, averaging 10.4 points and 5.7 assists.

Professional career

Atlanta Hawks (1985–1991) 
Most scouts predicted that Webb would end up playing in either Europe or for the Harlem Globetrotters because of his height. However, Webb was drafted in the 4th round of the 1985 NBA draft by the Detroit Pistons. After the guard-loaded Pistons released Spud, his agent, Bill Blakeley arranged for a tryout with the Atlanta Hawks where Spud beat out several seasoned guards to make the opening roster.

Sacramento Kings (1991–1995) 
Webb played his first six seasons with the Atlanta Hawks before he was traded to the Sacramento Kings for Travis Mays, where he had his best years statistically and played as a starter from 1992–1995.  Webb posted career highs of 16.0 points and 7.1 assists per game in his first season with the Kings. He also led the NBA in free throw shooting in his last season in Sacramento, shooting 93.4 percent in 1994-95 (after shooting 81.3 percent the previous season).

Return to Atlanta (1995–1996) 
In 1995, Webb was traded back to the Atlanta Hawks for Tyrone Corbin.

Minnesota Timberwolves (1996) 
Webb played half of the 1995-96 season with the Hawks before he was traded with Andrew Lang to the Minnesota Timberwolves for Christian Laettner and Sean Rooks.

Orlando Magic (1998) 
Webb finished his career after one season with the Orlando Magic, ultimately retiring from professional basketball in 1997.

Webb had over 50 games with 20 points or more including a career high 34 points against the Golden State Warriors on April 21, 1993 and a career high 18 assists against the Detroit Pistons on April 19, 1986.   Webb played 814 games in his 12-year NBA career, averaging 9.9 points per game, scoring 8,072 points. and registering 4,342 assists.

Since Webb made his NBA debut, only two players have been shorter than he was:  Muggsy Bogues and  Earl Boykins.

NBA Slam Dunk Contest
Webb was the shortest person to compete in the NBA Slam Dunk Contest, winning the event in 1986 at Dallas' Reunion Arena. His participation surprised the media; including his teammate and defending dunk champion Dominique Wilkins, who had "never seen me dunk before", Webb said. His dunks included the elevator two-handed double pump dunk, the off-the-backboard one-handed jam, a 360-degree helicopter one-handed dunk, a reverse double-pump slam, and finally, the reverse two-handed strawberry jam from a lob bounce off the floor. He defeated Wilkins with two perfect 50-point scores in the final round.  Atlanta coach Mike Fratello said, "Spud kind of duped him. He told Wilkins he never had anything prepared, didn't practice for it. So, Wilkins maybe thought his normal assortment would be good enough to get through". Twenty years after Webb's victory in the Slam Dunk contest, he trained New York Knicks point guard Nate Robinson (who stands at 5 feet 9 inches tall) to win the event. Webb tossed the ball to Robinson, who leaped over Webb and dunked, earning 50 points from the judges. Robinson went on to win, making he and Spud the only two people in NBA history under six feet tall to win a slam dunk contest.

The 1986 Slam Dunk victory along with his play as a rookie and fan favorite helped Webb to garner dozens of national endorsements from companies such as Pony Shoes, Coca-Cola, Church’s Fried Chicken, Baden Basketball, Hardee’s Hamburgers, Sunkist Oranges, Southland Corp and Chips Ahoy!

Webb was a judge for the 2010 Dunk contest in Dallas, at the American Airlines Center. It was the first time the event had been in Dallas since Webb's win in 1986.

NBA career statistics

Regular season 

|-
| align="left" | 
| align="left" | Atlanta
| 79 || 8 || 15.6 || .483 || .182 || .785 || 1.6 || 4.3 || 1.0 || .1 || 7.8
|-
| align="left" | 
| align="left" | Atlanta
| 33 || 0 || 16.1 || .438 || .167 || .762 || 1.8 || 5.1 || 1.0 || .1 || 6.8
|-
| align="left" | 
| align="left" | Atlanta
| 82 || 1 || 16.4 || .475 || .053 || .817 || 1.8 || 4.1 || .8 || .1 || 6.0
|-
| align="left" | 
| align="left" | Atlanta
| 81 || 6 || 15.0 || .459 || .045 || .867 || 1.5 || 3.5 || .9 || .1 || 3.9
|-
| align="left" | 
| align="left" | Atlanta
| style="background:#cfecec;"|82*  || 46 || 26.6 || .477 || .053 || .871 || 2.5 || 5.8 || 1.3 || .1 || 9.2
|-
| align="left" | 
| align="left" | Atlanta
| 75 || 64 || 29.3 || .447 || .321 || .868 || 2.3 || 5.6 || 1.6 || .1 || 13.4
|-
| align="left" | 
| align="left" | Sacramento
| 77 || 77 || 35.4 || .445 || .367 || .859 || 2.9 || 7.1 || 1.6 || .3 || 16.0
|-
| align="left" | 
| align="left" | Sacramento
| 69 || 68 || 33.8 || .433 || .274 || .851 || 2.8 || 7.0 || 1.5 || .1 || 14.5
|-
| align="left" | 
| align="left" | Sacramento
| 79 || 62 || 32.5 || .460 || .335 || .813 || 2.3 || 6.7 || 1.2 || .3 || 12.7
|-
| align="left" | 
| align="left" | Sacramento
| 76 || 76 || 32.3 || .438 || .331 || style="background:#cfecec;"|.934* || 2.3 || 6.2 || 1.0 || .1 || 11.6
|-
| align="left" | 
| align="left" | Atlanta
| 51 || 0 || 16.0 || .468 || .316 || .851 || 1.2 || 2.7 || .5 || .0 || 5.9
|-
| align="left" | 
| align="left" | Minnesota
| 26 || 21 || 24.8 || .394 || .403 || .879 || 1.5 || 5.9 || 1.0 || .2 || 9.4
|-
| align="left" | 
| align="left" | Orlando
| 4 || 0 || 8.5 || .417 || .000 || 1.000 || .8 || 1.3 || .3 || .0 || 3.0
|- class="sortbottom"
| style="text-align:center;" colspan="2"| Career
| 814 || 429 || 24.9 || .452 || .314 || .848 || 2.1 || 5.3 || 1.1 || .1 || 9.9

Playoffs 

|-
| align="left" | 1986
| align="left" | Atlanta
| 9 || 0 || 20.3 || .519 || .000 || .738 || 3.4 || 7.2 || .4 || .1 || 12.2
|-
| align="left" | 1987
| align="left" | Atlanta
| 8 || 1 || 15.3 || .474 || .000 || .765 || 1.0 || 4.8 || .8 || .0 || 3.9
|-
| align="left" | 1988
| align="left" | Atlanta
| 12 || 0 || 17.6 || .432 || .250 || .919 || 1.7 || 4.7 || .8 || .0 || 8.8
|-
| align="left" | 1989
| align="left" | Atlanta
| 5 || 0 || 11.0 || .273 || – || 1.000 || .8 || 3.0 || .8 || .0 || 1.6
|-
| align="left" | 1991
| align="left" | Atlanta
| 5 || 5 || 30.8 || .439 || .417 || .688 || 4.4 || 4.8 || 1.4 || .2 || 13.2
|-
|- class="sortbottom"
| style="text-align:center;" colspan="2"| Career
| 39 || 6 || 18.6 || .458 || .304 || .819 || 2.2 || 5.1 || .8 || .1 || 8.2

See also

 List of shortest players in National Basketball Association history

References

External links 
 
 
 2004 interview, "Catching Up with Spud Webb"

1963 births
Living people
African-American basketball players
American expatriate basketball people in Italy
American men's basketball players
Atlanta Hawks players
Basketball players from Dallas
Detroit Pistons draft picks
Idaho Stampede (CBA) players
Midland Chaps basketball players
Minnesota Timberwolves players
NC State Wolfpack men's basketball players
Orlando Magic players
Point guards
Sacramento Kings players
Scaligera Basket Verona players
United States Basketball League players